Keith Ronald Campbell (2 October 1931 – 13 July 1958) was an Australian professional Grand Prix motorcycle road racer.

Keith Campbell grew up in the Melbourne suburb of Prahran with the ambition to be a champion racing motorcyclist. He became Australia's first motorcycling road racing world champion when he won the 1957 FIM 350cc world championship as a member of the Moto Guzzi factory racing team.

He married Geraldine, the sister-in-law of Britain's championship rider Geoff Duke and came back to Australia on his honeymoon in December 1957. He returned to Europe as the star rider at the 500cc Grand Prix de Cadours near Toulouse in France. According to a newspaper report, in trials he had beaten all records for the circuit, lapping at 71.5 miles an hour. He was leading the race when he failed to round a bend known as Cox's Corner, crashed and was killed instantly. His cause of death was said to be a fractured skull. This same corner claimed the life of Frenchman Raymond Sommer in 1950 and the circuit is named in his honour. Campbell's wife Geraldine was watching the race from the pits but did not see the accident.

Motorcycle Grand Prix resultsKeith Campbell Isle of Man TT results at iomtt.com 

Points system from 1950 to 1968

5 best results were counted up until 1955.

(key) (Races in italics indicate fastest lap)

References

1931 births
1958 deaths
Sportspeople from Melbourne
Australian motorcycle racers
250cc World Championship riders
350cc World Championship riders
500cc World Championship riders
Isle of Man TT riders
Motorcycle racers who died while racing
Sport deaths in France
350cc World Riders' Champions